Hymenoxys helenioides is a North American species of flowering plant in the daisy family known by the common name intermountain rubberweed. It is native to Arizona, Utah, Colorado, and New Mexico in the western United States.

One plant generally produces as many as 50 flower heads. Each head has 10–16 ray flowers and 50–150 disc flowers.

References

External links

helenioides
Flora of the Western United States
Plants described in 1901
Flora without expected TNC conservation status